The Mariucci Classic is an annual men's college ice hockey tournament hosted by the University of Minnesota in Minneapolis, Minnesota.  The tournament is contested by the Minnesota Golden Gophers and three visiting teams.  Since the inaugural tournament in 1991, it has typically been held in December. The tournament went on hiatus for the 2017-18 and 2018-19 seasons, but returned for 2019-20.

Yearly results

External links
Mariucci Classic archive at the College Hockey Historical Archives

Minnesota Golden Gophers men's ice hockey
College ice hockey tournaments in the United States
Ice hockey in Minnesota